The 1937 Isle of Man Tourist Trophy saw Freddie Frith break the 90+ mph lap for the first time during the Senior TT with a speed of 90.27 mph on his Norton beating Stanley Woods by only 15 seconds. Frith also beat Wood in the Junior TT but only with a second placing.

The popular Jimmie Guthrie, who was killed during the German Grand Prix later that year, won Junior race but retired in the Senior TT at the Cutting, where a memorial was erected. The location, on the uphill climb from Ramsey to the Bungalow, on the Mountain Course, is now known as the Guthrie Memorial.

Harold Daniell who had been a works rider for AJS entered the 1937 TT with a three-year-old Norton tuned by his brother-in-law, Steve Lancefield which gave him a fifth place, a finishing position he also achieved in the Junior TT.

In the Lightweight TT Omobono Tenni becomes the first foreigner to secure a victory in an Isle of Man TT race on his Moto Guzzi.

Senior TT (500cc)

Junior TT (350cc)

Lightweight TT (250cc)

Notes
 Stanley Woods has an incident with a dog at the bottom of Bray Hill on the 1st lap of the 1937 Junior TT Race and also loses the rear brake at the same place.
 During lap 1 of the 1937 Junior TT Race, H.Pinnington riding a Norton crashes at the Windy Corner and Marcel Simo riding a Terrot motor-cycle crashes at Glentramman on lap 3. On lap 4, J. Illichmann riding a NSU is disqualified for illegal refuelling.
 Omobono Tenni is called "Tombone" by fellow competitors who cannot pronounce his name. On the first lap of the 1937 Lightweight TT Race, Omobono Tenni slips of at Governors Bridge on lap 1 and leaves part of his exhaust of his Moto Guzzi behind. On lap 5, Ewald Kluge retires his DKW at Ballaugh with a broken throttle wire and Stanley Woods on lap 6 his DKW retires at Sulby. H.G.Tyrell Smith breaks down at Creg-na-Baa when his Excelsior breaks a connecting-rod on lap 6.
 On the last lap of the 1937 Senior TT Race, Freddie Frith and Stanley Woods are posted as a dead-heat.

Sources

External links
 Detailed race results
 Isle of Man TT winners
 Mountain Course map

Isle of Man TT
1937
Isle